Norton is a village and former civil parish, now in the parish of Norton and Cuckney, in the Bassetlaw district, in the county of Nottinghamshire, England. It is just north of Cuckney, and is home to a number of farmsteads. Lying within the original extent of Sherwood Forest, and on its present edge, and lying within the Welbeck Abbey Estate. The civil parish was merged with Cuckney to form Norton and Cuckney. It is located not that far from the county's border with Derbyshire.

References 

Villages in Nottinghamshire
Former civil parishes in Nottinghamshire
Bassetlaw District
Sherwood Forest